T]ere are various Pokémon manga series, based on the Pokémon anime, video games, and trading card game. By 2000, the Pokémon manga series had sold over 7.25million tankobon volumes in the United States, including 1.001million copies of Pokémon: The Electric Tale of Pikachu volume 1, which is one of the best-selling single comic book in the United States since 1993.

List of Pokémon manga

Released in English

Manga released by Viz Media, Shogakukan Asia, and Chuang Yi

Manga released by Viz and Chuang

Manga released by Viz and Shogakukan Asia

Manga released by Viz

Pokémon Pocket Comics: Black & White
Pokémon Pocket Comics: Legendary Pokémon
Pokémon Pocket Comics: XY

Manga released by Chuang Yi

Manga released by Shogakukan Asia

Manga not released in English

 How I Became a Pokémon Card (Pokémon Card Ni Natta Wake) by Kagemaru Himeno, an artist for the TCG. There are six volumes and each includes a special promotional card. The stories tell the tales of the art behind some of Himeno’s cards.
 Mezase!! Card Master (Japanese: めざせ！！　カードマスター Aim to Be a Card Master) is a one-volume manga series drawn by Interu.
 Pokémon 4Koma Gag Battle (Japanese: ポケットモンスター　４コマギャグバトル Pokémon 4Koma Gag Battle) from Kobunsha Publishing Co.
 Pokémon 4Koma Ōhyakka (Japanese:  ポケモン4コマ大百科 Pokémon 4Koma Encyclopedia).
 Pokémon 4Koma Ōhyakka Kin・Gin (Japanese: ポケモン4コマ大百科 金・銀 Pokémon 4Koma Encyclopedia: Gold and Silver), a one-volume Pokémon manga based on Pokémon Gold and Silver created by Takahiro Yamashita.
 Pokémon Diamond/Pearl 4Koma Theatre by Ryuu Matsushita
 Pocket Monsters Platinum: Aim to Be Battle King!! (Japanese: ポケットモンスタープラチナ　めざせ!! バトル王) by Ryū Matsushima.
 Pocket Monsters Chamo-Chamo Pretty by Yumi Tsukirino, a spinoff and sequel to Magical Pokémon Journey.
 Pokémon Try Adventure (Japanese: ポケモントライアドベンチャー). This manga was released on June 28, 2010.
 Pocket Monsters RéBURST (Japanese: ポケットモンスターRéBURST), currently serialized in Weekly Shōnen Sunday.
 Pokémon Quiz Puzzle Land Pikachu wa Meitantei (Japanese: ポケモンクイズパズルランド　ピカチュウは名たんてい Pokémon Quiz Puzzle Land Pikachu is a Famous Detective) by Hiroshi Seto and Yumiko Sudo, a manga which uses puzzles as a method of storytelling.
 Pokémon - The Legend of the Dragon King (Japanese: ポケモン竜王伝 Pokémon - The Legend of the Dragon King) by Takashi Ishii.

Manga not collected in tankōbon format

 Pokémon Card GB The Comix (Japanese: ポケモンカードGB THE COMIX Pokémon Card GB The Comix), a one-shot Pokémon manga created by Kagemaru Himeno. It was published as part of the Pokémon Card GB Final Tactical Book strategy guide.
 Pokémon Card Game Battle Comic, featured in the Japanese Pokémon fan club, Pokémon Daisuki Club. It promotes the LEGEND series of the Pokémon Trading Card Game. 
 Exciting Victory! Pokémon Card Game! (Japanese: 激勝！ポケモンカードゲーム！！ Exciting Victory! Pokémon Card Game!)
 Let's Play the Pokémon Card Game XY! (Japanese: ポケモンカードゲームXY やろうぜ～っ! Let's Play the Pokémon Card Game XY!), a Pokémon manga series based on the Pokémon Trading Card Game created by Ryū Matsushima. It began in CoroCoro Comics' sister magazine CoroCoro Ichiban in December 2013.
 Pokémon Battle Stories (Japanese: ポケモンバトルストーリーズ)
 Kairiky's 24-Hour Strength Police!! (Japanese: カイリキーのかいりき警察24時!! Kairiky's 24-Hour Strength Police!!), a ten-page Pokémon manga created by Takahiro Yamashita.
 Pokémon: The First Movie - Mewtwo Strikes Back (Japanese: ミュウツーの逆襲 Mewtwo Strikes Back!)
 Pokémon: The Movie 2000 - The Power of One (Japanese: 幻のポケモン ルギア爆誕 Mirage Pokémon Lugia's Explosive Birth)
 Pokémon 3: The Movie - Spell of the Unown (Japanese: 結晶塔の帝王 ＥＮＴＥＩ Emperor of the Crystal Tower: Entei)
 Pokémon 4Ever: Celebi - Voice of the Forest (Japanese: セレビィ時を超えた遭遇 Celebi: a Timeless Encounter)
 Pokémon Heroes: Latios and Latias (Japanese: 水の都の護神 ラティアスとラティオス Guardian Gods of the City of Water: Latias and Latios)

 References 

External links
Pokémon at Viz Media at Viz Kids at Chuang Yi''
Pokémon manga at Bulbapedia

Shogakukan franchises
Nintendo franchises
Pokémon
Shōnen manga
manga
Pokémon